Wahlenbergfjorden, sometimes known in English as Waalenburg Bay, is a fjord on the southwest coast of the Arctic island of Nordaustlandet, in Norway's Svalbard archipelago. The fjord separates Gustav V Land in the north from Gustav Adolf Land in the south, at geographical co-ordinates . Its mouth faces Spitsbergen across Hinlopen Strait, the strait separating the two islands.

The fjord is named for the Swedish naturalist Göran Wahlenberg (1780-1851) and has been known by this name since at least the early 1930s. The glacier of Wahlenbergbreen in Oscar II Land, Spitsbergen, is also named for him.

References 

 Wahlenbergfjord, Svalbard place names database, Norwegian Polar Institute, 2005 (URL accessed 29 July 2006)
 Wahlenbergbreen, Svalbard place names database, Norwegian Polar Institute, 2005 (URL accessed 29 July 2006)

Fjords of Svalbard
Nordaustlandet